Joseph Addo may refer to:

Joe Addo (born 1971), Ghanaian footballer
Joseph Addo (footballer, born 1990), Ghanaian footballer